{{DISPLAYTITLE:C13H12N4O2}}
The molecular formula C13H12N4O2 (molar mass: 256.26 g/mol, exact mass: 256.0960 u) may refer to:

 Lumiflavin
 8-Phenyltheophylline (8-PT)